Royal Canadian College  may refer to:

 Royal Canadian College of Organists
 Royal Canadian Naval College

See also
 Royal Military College of Canada (Kingston)
 Royal Military College Saint-Jean
 Canadian Military Colleges
 Canadian College, Vancouver, BC, Canada
 Royal Canadian (disambiguation)
 Royal College (disambiguation)